Verkhnyaya Sinyachikha is an urban locality (an urban-type settlement) in Alapayevsky District of Sverdlovsk Oblast, Russia. Population:

References

Urban-type settlements in Sverdlovsk Oblast